Brad Pascall (born July 29, 1970) is a Canadian former professional ice hockey defenceman. He is currently an assistant general manager with the Calgary Flames of the National Hockey League (NHL). Pascall was selected by the Buffalo Sabres in the 5th round (103rd overall) of the 1990 NHL Entry Draft. Following his retirement as a player, Pascall worked as an executive for Hockey Canada. 

His wife, Cassie Campbell, captained the Canada women's national ice hockey team to gold medal victories at both the 2002 and 2006 Winter Olympics. His father, Bernie Pascall, was a sportscaster for the CTV Television Network in the 1970s and '80s and television play-by-play broadcaster for the Vancouver Canucks.

Career statistics

Regular season and playoffs

References

External links

1970 births
Living people
Birmingham Bulls players
Buffalo Sabres draft picks
Calgary Flames executives
Canadian ice hockey defencemen
Erie Panthers players
Ice hockey people from British Columbia
Langley Eagles players
North Dakota Fighting Hawks men's ice hockey players
People from Coquitlam
Rochester Americans players
South Carolina Stingrays players